Tommy Roper (born 6 July 1940) is a former speedway rider from England.

Speedway career 
Roper rode in the top tier of British Speedway from 1965 to 1974, riding for various clubs. He was an integral part of the Halifax Dukes team that won the double during the 1966 British League season, scoring a season average of 7.54. In 1967 he moved to Belle Vue Aces and was a member of the 1970 title winning team.

References 

Living people
1940 births
British speedway riders
Belle Vue Aces riders
Halifax Dukes riders
Hull Vikings riders
Long Eaton Archers riders
Middlesbrough Bears riders
Oxford Cheetahs riders
Sheffield Tigers riders
Sportspeople from Bradford